Joshua or Josh Miller may refer to:

Musicians
Joshua Miller, American musician with duo Nemesis also featured in Jacob and Joshua: Nemesis Rising 
Josh Miller, musician with The Pappy Johns Band

Sportsmen
Josh Miller (field hockey) in 2013 Sultan Azlan Shah Cup
Josh Miller (American football) (born 1970), American football punter
Josh Miller (baseball) (born 1978), American baseball coach
Josh Miller (cornerback) (born 1996)]], American gridiron football player
Josh Miller (rugby league) (born 1983), Australian rugby league footballer

Politicians
Joshua Miller (Rhode Island politician) (born 1954), member of the Rhode Island Senate
Joshua Miller (Iowa politician) (1822–1886), member of the Iowa Senate
Josh Miller (Arkansas politician) (born 1981), member of the Arkansas House of Representatives

Others
Joshua John Miller (born 1974), American actor
Josh Miller (education), American technology executive, director of product for the White House
Josh Miller (filmmaker) (born 1978), or Worm Miller, American writer, director, and actor
Joshua Miller (psychologist), psychology professor at the University of Georgia